Anomia is a genus of saltwater clams, marine bivalve mollusks in the family Anomiidae. They are commonly known as jingle shells because when a handful of them are shaken they make a jingling sound, though some are also known as saddle oysters.

This genus first appeared in the Permian period of China, Italy, and Pakistan. Anomia species are common in both tropical and temperate oceans and live primarily attached to rock or other shells via a calcified byssus that extends through the lower valve. Anomia shells tend to take on the surface shape of what they are attached to; thus if an Anomia is attached to a scallop shell, the shell of the Anomia will also show ribbing. The species A. colombiana has been found in the La Frontera Formation of Boyacá, Cundinamarca and Huila of Colombia.

Species
Species:

Anomia achaeus 
Anomia alta 
Anomia ampulla 
Anomia andraei 
Anomia angulata 
Anomia archaeus 
Anomia argentaria 
Anomia aurita 
Anomia beryx 
Anomia biloba 
Anomia bilocularis 
Anomia bipartita 
Anomia biplicata 
Anomia boettgeri 
Anomia caputserpentis 
Anomia chinensis 
Anomia complanata 
Anomia convexa 
Anomia costata 
Anomia costulata 
Anomia craniolaris 
Anomia cymbula 
Anomia cytaeum 
Anomia daduensis 
Anomia ephippioides 
Anomia ephippium 
Anomia fareta 
Anomia favrii 
Anomia gryphus 
Anomia hammetti 
Anomia hannai 
Anomia haustellum 
Anomia hinnitoides 
Anomia hysterita 
Anomia inconspicua 
Anomia interrupta 
Anomia kateruensis 
Anomia lacunosa 
Anomia laevigata 
Anomia lineata 
Anomia linensis 
Anomia lisbonensis 
Anomia macostata 
Anomia mamillaris 
Anomia mcgoniglensis 
Anomia microstriata 
Anomia mortilleti 
Anomia navicellodies 
Anomia onslowensis 
Anomia orbiculata 
Anomia ornata 
Anomia ornata 
Anomia pakistanica 
Anomia papyracea 
Anomia paucistriata 
Anomia pectinata 
Anomia pellisserpentis 
Anomia perlineata 
Anomia peruviana  (synonym: Anomia fidenas Gray, 1850)
Anomia plicata 
Anomia primaeva 
Anomia prisca 
Anomia pseudoradiata 
Anomia radiata 
Anomia reticularis 
Anomia ruffini 
Anomia sandalinum 
Anomia schafhaeutli 
Anomia senescens 
Anomia septenaria 
Anomia sergipensis 
Anomia simplex 
Anomia simplexiformis 
Anomia sinuosa 
Anomia spec 
Anomia striata 
Anomia striata 
Anomia striatula 
Anomia sublaevigata 
Anomia talahabensis 
Anomia taylorensis 
Anomia tenuistriata 
Anomia terebratula 
Anomia trigonopsis 
Anomia vancouverensis 
Anomia vaquerosensis 
Anomia verbeeki 
Anomia vespertilio

Reassigned species 
As Anomia was erected very early in paleontology, several species have been reassigned; most of them are now recognized as  brachiopods.
 A. angulata = Yanishewskiella angulata, brachiopod
 A. biloba = Dicoelosia biloba, brachiopod
 A. bilocularis = Conchidium biloculare, brachiopod
 A. caputserpentis Linné, 1758 = undetermined terebratulid brachiopod
 A. caputserpentis Linné, 1767 =  Terebratulina caputserpentis, brachiopod
 A. craniolaris = Crania craniolaris, brachiopod
 A. crispa = Delthyris elegans, brachiopod
 A. detruncata = Megathyris detruncata, brachiopod
 A. furcata = Monia zelandica
 A. nobilis = Monia nobilis
 A. pectinata = Rhynchora pectinata, brachiopod
 A. placenta  = Placuna placenta
 A. psittacea = Hemithiris psittacea, brachiopod
 A. reticularis = Atrypa reticularis, brachiopod
 A. retusa Linné, 1758 = Terebratulina caputserpentis, brachiopod
 A. rubra = Kraussina rubra, brachiopod
 A. sella = Placuna quadrangula
 A. squamula = Heteranomia squamula
 A. terebratula = Terebratula terebratula, brachiopod
 A. vitrea  = Gryphus vitreus, brachiopod

References

Anomiidae
Bivalve genera
Taxa described in 1758
Taxa named by Carl Linnaeus